Ludia is a genus of moths in the family Saturniidae. It was first described by Hans Daniel Johan Wallengren in 1865.

Species
Ludia arguta Jordan, 1922
Ludia arida Jordan, 1938
Ludia corticea Jordan, 1922
Ludia delegorguei (Boisduval, 1847)
Ludia dentata (Hampson, 1891)
Ludia goniata Rothschild, 1907
Ludia hansali Felder, 1874
Ludia jordani Bouyer, 1997
Ludia leonardo Stoneham, 1962
Ludia monroei Jordan, 1938
Ludia obscura Aurivillius, 1893
Ludia orinoptena Karsch, 1893
Ludia pseudovetusta Rougeot, 1978
Ludia pupillata Strand, 1911
Ludia styx Darge, 1996
Ludia syngena Jordan, 1922
Ludia tessmanni Strand, 1911

References

Saturniinae